Tropidophora deburghiae is a species of land snail with a gill and an operculum, a terrestrial gastropod mollusk in the family Pomatiidae.

This species is endemic to Madagascar.

References

Tropidophora
Molluscs of Madagascar
Gastropods described in 1861
Taxonomy articles created by Polbot